Gareth Wigan (December 2, 1931 – February 13, 2010) was a British agent, producer and studio executive known for working on such films as George Lucas's Star Wars.  His early recognition of the power of the global entertainment market allowed his employer, Sony Pictures Entertainment, to take advantage of films such as Crouching Tiger, Hidden Dragon.

Life and career 
Gareth Wigan was born in London on December 2, 1931. After graduating from Oxford in 1952 with a B.A. Honours degree in English literature, he began his career as a literary agent in the London office of MCA. He eventually founded an agency with Richard Gregson, Gregson & Wigan. Among his clients was the British playwright Giles Cooper whose story, "Unman, Wittering and Zigo" originally written for radio, was the first film Wigan produced, directed by John Mackenzie and starring David Hemmings. Gregson and Wigan was sold to EMI in 1970 and Gareth Wigan subsequently moved to Los Angeles.

Over the course of a 40-year career, Wigan rose from talent agent, to producer to studio head. Film credits include Star Wars, Alien, The Turning Point, Chariots of Fire, The Right Stuff, Bram Stoker's Dracula, Kick-Ass  and others.

He held numerous positions including Production Executive at 20th Century Fox, co-Vice Chairman at Columbia TriStar Motion Picture Group, a co-founder at The Ladd Company, production consultant at Columbia and more.

Death 
Gareth Wigan died at his Los Angeles home on February 13, 2010 at the age of 78.  Divorced by his first wife, Heather Germann, and pre-deceased by his second wife, Georgia Brown, he was survived by his third wife, Patricia Newcomb, and four children. A dedication to Wigan appears at the end credits of the 2010 film Kick-Ass.

References 

1931 births
2010 deaths
British film producers
British emigrants to the United States
Deaths from cancer in California
Businesspeople from London
People from Greater Los Angeles
Alumni of the University of Oxford
20th-century English businesspeople